Morula euryspira is a species of sea snail, a marine gastropod mollusk in the family Muricidae, the murex snails or rock snails.

Description
The length of the shell attains 15.5 mm.

Distribution
This marine species occurs off New Caledonia.

References

euryspira
Gastropods described in 1995